Spenser David Watkins (born August 27, 1992) is an American professional baseball pitcher for the Baltimore Orioles of Major League Baseball (MLB). He was drafted by the Detroit Tigers in the 30th round of the 2014 MLB draft, and made his MLB debut for the Orioles in 2021.

Career

Detroit Tigers
Watkins attended Horizon High School in Scottsdale, Arizona. He was drafted by the Detroit Tigers out of Western Oregon University in the 30th round, 910th overall, of the 2014 Major League Baseball draft. Watkins made his professional debut with the rookie-level GCL Tigers, posting a 3–2 record and 3.83 ERA in 10 games. He split the 2015 season between the Low-A Connecticut Tigers and the Single-A West Michigan Whitecaps, accumulating a 5–4 record and 2.48 ERA in 16 games between the two teams. On April 18, 2016, Watkins was suspended 50 games after a second positive test of a drug of abuse. Once activated he spent time with the Double-A Erie SeaWolves and West Michigan, pitching to a 5–3 record and 3.97 ERA between the two teams.

In 2017, Watkins split the season between the High-A Lakeland Flying Tigers and West Michigan, pitching to a cumulative 9–4 record and 3.53 ERA with 83 strikeouts in 109.2 innings of work. For the 2018 season, Watkins played with the Triple-A Toledo Mud Hens, Erie, and Lakeland, logging a 10–7 record and 2.76 ERA in 27 appearances between the three clubs. In 2019, Watkins split time between Toledo, Erie, and Lakeland, struggling to a 6.07 ERA and 9–7 record with 121 strikeouts in 138.0 innings pitched.

Watkins did not play in a game in 2020 due to the cancellation of the minor league season because of the COVID-19 pandemic. On July 3, 2020, Watkins was released by the Tigers organization.

Baltimore Orioles
On February 2, 2021, Watkins signed a minor league contract with the Baltimore Orioles organization. Prior to signing with the Orioles, Watkins had been in line to take over as the head coach of the Paradise Valley High School freshman baseball team in Phoenix, Arizona.

He was assigned to the Triple-A Norfolk Tides to begin the season, where he worked as a starter and logged a 1–2 record and 3.58 ERA in 7 games (6 of them starts).

On June 30, 2021, Watkins was selected to the 40-man roster and promoted to the major leagues for the first time. He made his MLB debut on July 2, pitching a scoreless inning in relief against the Los Angeles Angels. He also became the first player in franchise history to don the uniform number 80. On July 6, Watkins made his first career start against the Toronto Blue Jays, earning his first ever win after pitching 5.0 innings of 1-run ball. In the game, Watkins also notched his first career strikeout, punching out Blue Jays outfielder Randal Grichuk. Watkins was outrighted off of the 40-man roster on November 5 and elected free agency on November 7. On November 11, Watkins re-signed with the Orioles on a minor league contract that included an invitation to spring training. On April 11, 2022, Watkins's contract was selected by the Orioles.

References

External links

1992 births
Living people
Baseball players from Phoenix, Arizona
Major League Baseball pitchers
Baltimore Orioles players
Glendale Gauchos baseball players
Western Oregon Wolves baseball players
Gulf Coast Tigers players
West Michigan Whitecaps players
Connecticut Tigers players
Erie SeaWolves players
Lakeland Flying Tigers players
Toledo Mud Hens players
Norfolk Tides players